Thomas Henry Dale (June 12, 1846 – August 21, 1912) was a Republican member of the U.S. House of Representatives from Pennsylvania.

Dale was born in Daleville, Pennsylvania. He attended the Wyoming Seminary in Kingston, Pennsylvania. During the American Civil War, Dale enlisted in the Union Army in 1863. After discharge from the service engaged in business as a coal operator, and in the wholesale beef business.

He was also interested in various other business enterprises in Scranton, Pennsylvania. He was instrumental in organizing the Scranton Board of Trade and was its president for several terms. He served as chairman of the Republican county committee for several years. He was elected as prothonotary of Lackawanna County, Pennsylvania, from 1882 to 1892. He was a delegate to the 1896 Republican National Convention.

Dale was elected as a Republican to the Fifty-ninth Congress. He was an unsuccessful candidate for reelection in 1906. He served as president of the Anthracite Trust Company in Scranton.

He died in Daleville, aged 66; interred in Dunmore Cemetery.

References

 Retrieved on 2008-02-14
The Political Graveyard

1846 births
1912 deaths
People from the Scranton–Wilkes-Barre metropolitan area
Pennsylvania prothonotaries
Union Army soldiers
Republican Party members of the United States House of Representatives from Pennsylvania
19th-century American politicians